The Museum of the Royal Mint (Museo Casa de la Moneda) is a permanent exhibition for the Spanish Royal Mint in Madrid, Spain, begun in 1867.

Exhibits

See also 
 List of museums in Madrid
 Casa de Moneda de Jubia

References

External links 
 Official website in Spanish and English
 Museo Casa de la moneda. Madrid on BnF

Museums in Madrid
1867 establishments in Spain
Tourist attractions in Madrid
Numismatic museums in Spain
Philatelic museums
Buildings and structures in Salamanca District, Madrid